Priyanka Gope is a Bangladeshi singer. She won the Bangladesh National Film Award for Best Female Playback Singer for her performance in the film Anil Bagchir Ekdin (2015). It was her debut as a playback singer.

Early life and education
Gope was trained under Ananda Chakrabarty, Dr. Asit Roy, Pt. Arun Bhaduri, Pt. Urmi Dasgupta, and Waheedul Haq. She completed her B. Muse and M. Muse from the Department of Vocal Music at Rabindra Bharati University, Kolkata as ICCR scholar. She did her Ph.D. degree from University of Dhaka.  Her thesis was entitled "The Aesthetics and Diversity of North Indian Classical Music. She is an enlisted as a "special grade" artist of Bangladesh Betar and Bangladesh Television in Rabindra Sangeet, Nazrul Sangeet, modern song, and classical music categories.

Career
Gope teaches as Associate Professor at Music Department of the University of Dhaka. As of she got Channel I music award in 2017, 2018 for best Classical Vocalist and in 2020, 2022 for best Nazrul Sangeet Singer. Also she got Rtv Award in 2017 for best female Singer.she released four solo albums and many more mixed albums including the classical albums Sure Sure Dekha Hobe and Raga Delights from Bengal Foundation, Thumri Vol-1 from G Series.

References

External links
 

Living people
Bangladeshi Hindus
21st-century Bangladeshi women singers
21st-century Bangladeshi singers
Bangladeshi playback singers
Rabindra Bharati University alumni
Academic staff of the University of Dhaka
Best Female Playback Singer National Film Award (Bangladesh) winners
Year of birth missing (living people)
Place of birth missing (living people)